Niklas Uwe Schmidt (born 1 March 1998) is a German professional footballer who plays as a midfielder for Werder Bremen. At international level, he represented Germany's U16, U17, and U19 youth teams.

Club career
Schmidt is a youth exponent from Werder Bremen. He made his 3. Liga debut on 31 July 2016 against Sportfreunde Lotte. He played the full game.

On 24 September 2016, he made his first team debut in the Bundesliga against VfL Wolfsburg coming on as a 76th-minute substitute for captain Clemens Fritz and assisting the 2–1 winner in stoppage time.

In July 2018, Schmidt joined 3. Liga side SV Wehen Wiesbaden on loan for the 2018–19 season while his contract with Werder Bremen was extended.

In June 2019, it was announced he had agreed a "long-term" extension of his contract with Werder Bremen and that he would join VfL Osnabrück on a two-year loan.

Following his return from loan at Osnabrück in summer 2021 Schmidt was expected to leave Werder Bremen. Good performances in pre-season training and matches earned him playing time at the club. In October, having made nine league appearances in which he scored one goal and made four assists, he signed a contract extension.

International career
Schmidt is a Germany youth international having represented the country at U16, U17, and U19 levels.

Career statistics

References

External links
 

1998 births
Living people
Association football midfielders
German footballers
Germany youth international footballers
SV Werder Bremen players
SV Werder Bremen II players
SV Wehen Wiesbaden players
VfL Osnabrück players
Bundesliga players
3. Liga players
2. Bundesliga players